Babelio is a French social cataloging website and a mobile app dedicated to literature. It is a social network for users to review books and generate personal library catalogs, which can be shared and commented on by other users.

It has been called the French equivalent of Goodreads.

History
Babelio was launched in January 2007 by three bibliophiles: Guillaume Teisseire, Vassil Stefanov and Pierre Fremaux. It began as a social media website specializing in books. In France, Babelio was the first of its kind to be created. It is supported by publishers such as Éditions Albin Michel, Éditions du Seuil and Fayard. Many of the site's most active users receive copies of books in advance from various publishers and are invited to share their reviews. Users can participate in the "Masse critique" contest to win book copies.

In October 2018, Babelio had 650,000 users and was visited monthly by approximately 3.7 million internet users. By June 2020, Babelio had a community of 950,000 users. By June 2021, Babelio had a community of 1.1 million users.

Features

For the general public
For the books that are in their library, users have the ability to rate, write a review, extract quotes, create thematic lists, participate in games and create quizzes. Members also have a personalized home page that offers a news feed related to their literary tastes. Based on members' libraries and the ratings they have given to books, the site also offers users the opportunity to discover other user with similar literary tastes. Users also have the opportunity to converse through a group function, allowing them to send public messages. A thematic labeling system also allows users to navigate the database of books. Users thereby explore using keyword clouds, offering a collaborative and community form of classification.

Babelio offers excerpts from reviews and links to the vast majority of professional literary columns published in the general and specialized press. Columns from a large number of media sources are thus included in the cataloging data of each book.

The site also offers a mobile application compatible with the iOS and Android operating systems.

At the beginning of 2018, Babelio launched a Spanish-language version of their website.

For literary professionals
Babelio offers a social network of authors intended to connect writers and their readers according to their literary tastes. The site also offers public libraries the opportunity to enrich their catalogs with community content (reviews, quotes, keyword clouds) through its Babelthèque website.

Prix Babelio
In 2019, Babelio launched its annual readers' prize, the Prix Babelio, which rewards 10 winners in 10 categories. The first edition of the prize was awarded on 19 June 2019 and was decided as the result of 29,000 votes by 7,000 participating users. The 2nd Prix Babelio was awarded on 17 June 2020 as the result of 50,000 votes by 11,500 voters participating users. The 3rd Prix Babelio was awarded on 17 June 2021 as the result of 52,500 votes by 11,000 voters participating users. The 4th Prix Babelio was awarded on 15 June 2022 as the result of 51,000 votes by 10,000 voters participating users.

Winners

See also
 aNobii
 BookArmy
 Bookish
 Goodreads
 LibraryThing
 Shelfari

References

External links
 , at babelio.com
 Website of the Spanish version, at es.babelio.com

French literature websites
French social networking websites
Book review websites
Companies based in Paris
Internet properties established in 2007
Social cataloging applications
Multilingual websites
French companies established in 2007
Book websites
Library 2.0